Vladan Spaić (born 18 June 1997) is a Montenegrin water polo player. He is currently playing for the CN Marseille. He is 6' 2½" (189 cm) tall and weighs 227 lb (103 kg).

References 

1997 births
Living people
Montenegrin male water polo players
Water polo players at the 2020 Summer Olympics
Olympic water polo players of Montenegro